Mogale City Local Municipality is a local municipality in West Rand District Municipality, Gauteng, in South Africa.

Main places
The 2001 census divided the municipality into the following main places:

Politics 

The municipal council consists of seventy-seven members elected by mixed-member proportional representation. Thirty-nine councillors are elected by first-past-the-post voting in thirty-nine wards, while the remaining thirty-eight are chosen from party lists so that the total number of party representatives is proportional to the number of votes received. In the election of 1 November 2021 the African National Congress (ANC) won a plurality of thirty-one seats on the council but failed to win an overall majority by eight seats. At the first council meeting on 23 November 2021, the DA's Tyrone Gray was elected mayor and the DA's Jacqueline Pannall was elected speaker.

The following table shows the results of the election.

Management
As of 2021 the municipality's debt with Eskom was in excess of R361 million, but it was honoring its payments in terms of their signed agreement.

See also
 List of South African municipalities

References

External links
 Official website

 
Local municipalities of the West Rand District Municipality